In mathematics, an interleave sequence is obtained by merging two sequences via an in shuffle.

Formally, it is the sequence   given by

Properties
 Consider two real numbers a and b greater than zero and smaller than 1. In this way one obtains an injection from the square  to the interval (0, 1). Different radixes give rise to different injections; the one for the binary numbers is called the Z-order curve or Morton code.

References

Real analysis
Sequences and series